Lambertus Emaline "Bert" Fenenga (March 6, 1890 – September 20, 1981) was an American football player and coach. He served as the head football coach at Northern Normal and Industrial School—now known was Northern State University—in Aberdeen, South Dakota in 1917, compiling a record of 6–0.

As an undergraduate, he was credited with giving Yankton College its nickname, the "Greyhounds."

Head coaching record

References

External links
 

1890 births
1981 deaths
Northern State Wolves football coaches
Yankton Greyhounds football players
People from Douglas County, South Dakota
Players of American football from South Dakota